Stary Kostrzynek  is a village in the administrative district of Gmina Cedynia, within Gryfino County, West Pomeranian Voivodeship, in north-western Poland, close to the German border. Stary Kostrzynek is the westernmost point in Poland.

Before 1945 the area was part of Brandenburg (Frankfurt Region) within Prussia, Germany. For more on the history of the region, see New March.

References

Stary Kostrzynek